Mobolaji Olufunso Johnson (9 February 1936 – 30 October 2019) was a Nigerian Army Brigadier who served as Military Administrator of the Federal territory of Lagos from January 1966 to May 1967 during the military regime of General Aguyi-Ironsi (to July 1966, and General Gowon subsequently), and then as Governor of Lagos State from May 1967 to July 1975 during the military regime of General Yakubu Gowon. As Governor of Lagos, his administration supervised the unpopular demolition of the Ajele Cemetery in the early 1970s.

Early life and education
Johnson was born to the family of Joshua Motola Johnson and his wife, Gbemisola Johnson (née Dudley-Coker). His father was of Lagos indigene and was a member of the Royal West African Frontier Force during World War. His grandfather's last name was previously Osholero but he changed it to Johnson after the priest who converted him to Christianity. The Johnson family moved to Lagos during the early parts of the twentieth century. Johnson had five other siblings including his brother, Femi Johnson, founder of Femi Johnson and Company of Ibadan. Mobolaji Johnson started his education at Reagean Memorial Baptist School, Yaba, Methodist School in 1941. He then attended Hussey College, Warri, 1954. In 1955, he moved to Methodist Boys High School Lagos, the School his father attended, where he finished his secondary education in 1957. While in MBHS, Lagos, Mobolaji was a good all-round sports man. In 1959 Mobolaji attended the Officer Cadet Training School in Ghana. 
Mobolaji Johnson also attended the Mons Officer Cadet School in Aldershot and the Royal Military Academy, Sandhurst, United Kingdom, between 1960–1961.

Military career
Zaria Military Depot, 1958–1959.
United Nations Peace Keeping Troops, Congo
He was promoted a 2nd Lieutenant, Nigeria Army, 1961.
Lieutenant, 1962, Captain, October 1962.
Appointed Deputy Commander, Federal Guards, 1964.
Commander, Federal Guards, 1964.
Deputy Adjutant and Quartermaster-General Headquarters, 2nd Brigade, Apapa, Lagos, 1964.
Major, February 1966;
Second in command, 4th Battalion, Ibadan.
Station Commander, Benin, Midwest (old Bendel State).

Biafra War
At the end of the famed Biafra War, Johnson was amongst the  federal delegates at the end of the war ceremony.
In 1966, after the abortive coup d'etat that put paid to the first Nigerian civilian administration, he became Military Administrator of Lagos State. In 1967 he became the First Governor of Lagos State. Johnson's tenure as Military Governor of Lagos State saw the building of major infrastructure in Lagos State.

Governor
Johnson was first appointed by Aguiyi-Ironsi as the administrator of the former federal territory of Lagos in 1966. Ironsi was the head of state and wanted someone from Lagos to handle some of the problems of the federal territory. In May 1967, Lagos State was created and Johnson became the first governor of Lagos; the state was now composed of the old Federal Territory of Victoria Island, Ikoyi and Lagos Island plus the additions of the Epe, Badagry, Ikorodu and Ikeja divisions. He was involved in developing the civil service in Lagos State. Johnson was initially assisted in running the state with help from some key civil servants such as Administrative Secretary, Adeymi-Bero, Finance Secretary, F.C.O Coker, and the acting secretary to the Military Government, Howson Wright and waited until April 1968 before appointing his commissioners.

Building Lagos
 60.7-kilometre international express road (Lagos–Badagry Expressway) linking Nigeria with the neighbouring countries Benin, Ghana and Togo.
 Toikin Bridge to link Epe to Ikorodu
 Eko Bridge
 Third Mainland Bridge
 A network of roads and bridges that constitutes what is modern day Lagos
 Reclamation of the Bar Beach shoreline.
Another coup ushered in a new military government in 1975. A new administration came in, under an anti-corruption banner.

Demolition of Ajele Cemetery
Johnson's administration was responsible for the demolition and disinterment of people buried at Ajele Cemetery such as Samuel Ajayi Crowther, James Pinson Labulo Davies, Madam Tinubu, Thomas Babington Macaulay, and many others. The demolition met with a lot of criticism: Prof J.D.Y. Peel noted that the demolition had deprived "Lagosians not only of a precious green space in the heart of the city but of the memorials of their forebears". Nobel Laureate Wole Soyinka called the demolition "the violation of that ancestral place" noting that "the order came from the military governor [Mobolaji Johnson]: 'Dig up those dead and forgotten ancestors and plant a modern council building – with all its lucrative corollaries on that somnolent spot".

Retirement

In 1975 at the inception of the General Murtala Mohammed administration Johnson was one of the two state Governors (along with Brigadier General Oluwole Rotimi) found not guilty of corruption by the three-man panel commissioned to investigate the various allegations of corruption amongst the State Governors.

General Johnson retired from the Nigerian Army in 1975 and went into private business.
He had four children, three sons and a daughter.

Later life

Johnson was the Chairman of Nigerian Conservation Foundation.

He became a Director  of construction giant Julius Berger Nigeria in 1979 and its chairman in 1996, a post he held until 2009.

Johnson was the Chairman Executive Council of Lagos State University Development Foundation.

He was the Chairman of the Board of Trustees of Methodist Boys' High School, Lagos Old Boys' National Association. He was honoured with the position because he was a distinguished Old Boy who was of great assistance to his Alma Mater.

His daughter-in-law is Omobola Johnson.

Mobolaji Johnson died  on October 30, 2019 at the age of 83 in his home. His death was announced by his son, Deji Johnson. Deji has 3 children himself, two daughters and a son.

Seyi Johnson who is currently Business Development Director at Julius Berger also one of his 3 sons.

Legacy 

A road, an avenue, and a sports complex in Mobolaji's home state bear his name as well as a Housing Scheme at Lekki  both in Lagos. A railway station in Ebute Metta, Lagos was named in his honour.

See also
 Timeline of Lagos, 1960s–1970s

References

Further reading

1936 births
2019 deaths
Governors of Lagos State
Graduates of the Mons Officer Cadet School
Graduates of the Royal Military Academy Sandhurst
Hussey College Warri alumni
Lagos State University people
Library of Congress Africa Collection related
Methodist Boys' High School alumni
Nigerian Army officers
Nigerian generals
People from Lagos
Yoruba military personnel
Yoruba politicians
Nigerian chairpersons of corporations
Yoruba businesspeople
Residents of Lagos